Astragalus inyoensis is a species of milkvetch known by the common name Inyo milkvetch.

It is native to the Great Basin Desert mountains and flats of western Nevada, and the White and Inyo Mountains of eastern California, US.

Description
Astragalus inyoensis is a low, mat-forming perennial herb with slender, crooked gray-green stems growing up to 60 centimeters long. The leaves are a few centimeters long and are made up of several oval scoop-shaped leaflets each a few millimeters in length.

The inflorescence produces up to 15 pinkish purple flowers each around a centimeter long. The fruit is a hanging legume pod just over a centimeter long which is narrow and curved in shape and leathery in texture.

References

External links
Jepson Manual Treatment - Astragalus inyoensis
USDA Plants Profile for Astragalus inyoensis

inyoensis
Flora of the California desert regions
Flora of Nevada
Flora of the Great Basin
Endemic flora of the United States
Natural history of Inyo County, California
Plants described in 1893
Flora without expected TNC conservation status